is a Japanese pop singer. Since his debut, Ki-Yo has worked as a singer, composer, lyricist and ambassador of Miyagi Prefecture. He's known as one of the few openly LGBT musicians in Japan.

History

Early life 
In 1982, Ki-Yo was born in Sendai, Miyagi. He was musically influenced by Mariah Carey, Stevie Wonder, Aretha Franklin, Akiko Yano, Elton John, Billy Joel, Noriyuki Makihara, Whitney Houston.

2000–2006: debut and career in Japan 
In 2000, Ki-Yo sent a demo to EMI Music Japan when he visited Tokyo to see a concert by Mariah Carey, and was signed by the label for his debut. On October 22, 2000, his first single "No No No" was released. It was a success, charting No. 45 on the Oricon single weekly chart.

On April 18, 2001, "The Only One", his most commercially successful single to date, was released as a third single. It was used in a romantic drama, "Pure Soul ~Kimi ga boku wo wasuretemo~". Eventually, this single charted on the Oricon single yearly chart at No. 82 and Oricon single weekly chart at No. 12 with selling over 400,000 copies. He subsequently appeared in the Japanese music TV show Music Station twice.

His debut album I'll be there was released on July 25, 2001. It charted No. 7 on the Oricon album weekly chart.

In 2004, he sang a backing vocal part in "Shiawase ni narou"（幸せになろう）, a song by Japanese popular singer Hiromi Iwasaki.
This song was included in her 25th album, "Happiness" and it peaked at No. 99 on Oricon Weekly Album Chart.

On December 8, 2004, he released an EP "Stop On By", which includes a cover of a Japanese popular children's song "Tenohira wo Taiyou ni", whose lyrics were written by Takashi Yanase, a Japanese cartoonist best known for Anpanman.

In 2006, he released "Ocean Blue" as an eighth single. It had been two years since he had released his last EP "Stop On By". The song did not enter any charts. This was the last single he released from major record companies to date.

2010–present: working in America and going back to Japan 
In 2010, he moved to New York City and started working there. He participated in McDonald's Gospelfest, Gospel Night at Apollo Theater and a play called Black Nativity in Broadway.

In 2011, he was invited to Annual Keepers of the Dream Award Ceremony as a guest choir. His musical talent was praised by Stevie Wonder.

He was played at musical venues including the Bitter End, Canal Room and Whisky a Go Go.

On November 19, 2014, he covered "Let It Go" in the Japanese popular music competition program "The Karaoke Battle".

In 2015, he wrote a song called  for a Japanese top singer, Misia.
This song was included in her album, "Love Bebop", which was released on January 6, 2015 and this album charted at No. 4 on Oricon Daily Album Chart.
Also, this song was used in a TV commercial of a Japanese famous drink manufacturer, Kirin beverage.

On December 27, 2015, he performed on a live event, "Sing Mariah" with Japanese female singer Mao Denda. Her first album "Eternal Voice" has sold over 50,000 copies so far.
In May 2016, he announced that he left his management team "Rhythmedia".

On June 30, 2016, he started crowdfunding to release his fourth studio album .

Personal life 
Ki-Yo is openly gay. He came out in TOKYO RAINBOW PRIDE 2015.

He took part in "OUT IN JAPAN", an LGBT project by Singaporean photographer Leslie Kee.

Discography

Albums

Studio albums

Reissue albums

Remix albums

Compilation albums

Extended plays

Singles

As lead artist

Promotional singles

DVDs 
KIYOTAKA Tour 2010 Over The Sea (Yokohama Edition(BLUE))（2010）
KIYOTAKA Tour 2010 Over The Sea (Osaka Edition(RED))（2010）
Viaggio in Italia　2008（2011）
KIYOTAKA LIVE TOUR 2011 "OVER THE SEA"（2011）
KIYOTAKA AUTUMN TOUR 2011 "SOUL FROM NEW YORK"（2012）
Ki-Yo JAPAN TOUR 2012 "#1"（2013）
Ki-Yo LIVE at Canal Room in New York（2013）

References

External links 
 Official Website
 
 
 
 

1982 births
Japanese male singer-songwriters
Japanese male pop singers
Japanese gay musicians
Gay singers
Japanese LGBT singers
Japanese LGBT songwriters
Gay songwriters
Living people
21st-century Japanese male singers
20th-century LGBT people
21st-century LGBT people